The Cal State Bakersfield Roadrunners women's basketball represents California State University, Bakersfield in Bakersfield, California, United States. They compete in the Big West Conference.

History
Cal State Bakersfield began play in 2000. As of the end of the 2015–16 season, the Roadrunners have an all-time record of 317–171. They were a member of the California Collegiate Athletic Association from 2000 to 2006 before joining the WAC in 2013. They have never made the NCAA Division I Tournament, only making appearances in the Division II Tournament (as of 2017) in 2001, 2002, 2003, 2004, 2005 and 2006. The Roadrunners played in the Women's Basketball Invitational in 2010 and 2011, finishing runner up in 2011. They made the WNIT in 2014 and 2015.

Postseason

NCAA Division II tournament results
The Roadrunners made six appearances in the NCAA Division II women's basketball tournament. They had a combined record of 6–6.

See also
2013–14 Cal State Bakersfield Roadrunners women's basketball team
2015–16 Cal State Bakersfield Roadrunners women's basketball team
Cal State Bakersfield Roadrunners men's basketball

References

External links